The Saskatchewan Dragoons is a Primary Reserve armoured regiment of the Canadian Army. The unit is based in Moose Jaw. Their primary job is to assist the Regular Force in meeting Canada's military commitments.  Their training and equipment closely follow that of the Regular Force, which the Reserves are called upon to assist increasingly often. The Saskatchewan Dragoons are part of 3rd Canadian Division's 38 Canadian Brigade Group.

Prince Edward, Earl of Wessex, became colonel-in-chief of the regiment on visiting Saskatchewan in 2003, when he congratulated the regiment on its "contribution to Canada's proud tradition of citizen-soldiers in the community". Involved in peacekeeping operations in Cyprus, the Golan Heights, Bosnia and Croatia, members of the regiment have also provided aid during floods and forest fires in the prairies.

Role 
Their role is that of a reconnaissance squadron. They examine an area in preparation for the advance of a main body of troops. They go forward, sometimes many miles, and gather information on enemy strength, equipment, movements, and intentions.  They pass this information, together with other helpful information on such things as bridges, blocked roads, and areas of potential danger, back to higher command so the advance can take place as safely as possible. At the same time they deny such information to the enemy. In the withdrawal, they maintain contact with the enemy while the main body pulls back. Thus, they often speak of their role as "first in last out".

Lineage

The Saskatchewan Dragoons 
The Saskatchewan Dragoons originated in Regina, Saskatchewan on 3 July 1905, when a regiment of infantry was authorized to be formed in the districts of Assiniboia and Saskatchewan.

It was designated the 95th Regiment on 2 April 1907 and the 95th Saskatchewan Rifles on 1 June 1909.

On 1 April 1912 the regiment was reorganized as two separate regiments, the 105th Regiment (now The North Saskatchewan Regiment) and the 95th Saskatchewan Rifles.

On 15 March 1920, it was amalgamated with the 60th Rifles of Canada and redesignated The South Saskatchewan Regiment.

On 15 May 1924, The South Saskatchewan Regiment was reorganized into five separate regiments, The Assiniboia Regiment (now the 10th Field Artillery Regiment, RCA), The Regina Rifle Regiment (now The Royal Regina Rifles), The Weyburn Regiment (now The South Saskatchewan Regiment), The Saskatchewan Border Regiment (now The South Saskatchewan Regiment) and The South Saskatchewan Regiment.

It was redesignated The King's Own Rifles of Canada on 15 September 1924.

On 15 December 1936, it was amalgamated with B Company of the 12th Machine Gun Battalion, CMGC (now The Royal Regina Rifles) and redesignated The King's Own Rifles of Canada (MG).

It was redesignated the 2nd Battalion, The King's Own Rifles of Canada on 29 January 1942 and, upon conversion to armour, the 20th (Saskatchewan) Armoured Regiment, RCAC, on 1 April 1946, the 20th Saskatchewan Armoured Regiment on 4 February 1949, The Saskatchewan Dragoons (20th Armoured Regiment) on 31 July 1954 and The Saskatchewan Dragoons on 19 May 1958.

The Saskatchewan Dragoons were restricted to one squadron on 1 September 1970.

Lineage chart

Perpetuations 
The Saskatchewan Dragoons perpetuate the 46th Battalion (South Saskatchwewan), CEF and the 128th Battalion (Moose Jaw), CEF.

Operational history

Great War
Details of the 60th Rifles of Canada and the 95th Saskatchewan Rifles were placed on active service on 6 August 1914 for local protective duty.

The 46th Battalion (South Saskatchewan), CEF, was authorized on 7 November 1914 and embarked for Britain on 23 October 1915, disembarking in France on 11 August 1916, where it fought as part of the 10th Infantry Brigade, 4th Canadian Division in France and Flanders until the end of the war. The battalion was disbanded on 30 August 1920.

Sgt Hugh Cairns of the 46th Battalion (South Saskatchewan), CEF, was posthumously awarded the Victoria Cross for his actions at Valenciennes, destroying several enemy machine gun positions and capturing numerous enemy soldiers over the course of several engagements on 1 November 1918. He was severely wounded while disarming a party of 60 German soldiers he had forced to surrender and died of his wounds the next day.

The 128th Battalion (Moose Jaw), CEF, was authorized on 22 December 1915 and embarked for Britain on 15 August 1916, where it provided reinforcements to the Canadian Corps in the field until 13 February 1917, when it was allotted to the 13th Infantry Brigade, 5th Canadian Division in England. On 27 May 1917 its personnel were absorbed by the 19th Reserve Battalion, CEF. The battalion was disbanded on 30 August 1920.

Second World War
The regiment mobilized the 1st Battalion, The King's Own Rifles of Canada, CASF, on 29 January 1942. The unit served in Canada in a home defence role as part of the 14th Canadian Infantry Brigade, 8th Canadian Infantry Division. The battalion was disbanded on 30 March 1946.

Battle honours

Those battle honours in bold type are emblazoned on the regiment's guidon.

Great War
MOUNT SORREL
SOMME, 1916
Ancre Heights
Ancre, 1916
ARRAS, 1917, '18
Vimy, 1917
HILL 70
YPRES, 1917
Passchendaele
AMIENS
Scarpe, 1918
Drocourt-Quéant
HINDENBURG LINE
Canal du Nord
VALENCIENNES
FRANCE AND FLANDERS, 1916-18

War in Afghanistan
AFGHANISTAN

Armoury

Notes and references

External links

Order of precedence

Armoured regiments of Canada
Dragoon regiments of Canada
Moose Jaw
Military units and formations of Saskatchewan
Armoured regiments & units of Canada in World War II
Military units and formations established in 1913